669 Kypria is a minor planet orbiting the Sun that was discovered by German astronomer August Kopff on August 20, 1908.

This is a member of the dynamic Eos family of asteroids that most likely formed as the result of a collisional breakup of a parent body.

References

External links
 
 

Eos asteroids
Kypria
Kypria
S-type asteroids (Tholen)
19080820